Gertrud Dempwolf is a German politician of the Christian Democratic Union (CDU) and former member of the German Bundestag.

Life 
On 22 March 1984, she moved to the Bundestag to replace Horst Schröder, who had resigned, and was a member of the German Bundestag until 1998. On 17 November 1994 she was appointed Parliamentary State Secretary to the Federal Minister for Family Affairs, Senior Citizens, Women and Youth in the Federal Government headed by Chancellor Helmut Kohl. She left office on 26 October 1998 after the 1998 federal elections.

References 

1936 births
Living people
Members of the Bundestag for Lower Saxony
Members of the Bundestag 1994–1998
Members of the Bundestag 1990–1994
Members of the Bundestag 1987–1990
Members of the Bundestag 1983–1987
Female members of the Bundestag
20th-century German women politicians
Members of the Bundestag for the Christian Democratic Union of Germany
Parliamentary State Secretaries of Germany